Summit Station may refer to:
 Summit Station, California (disambiguation)
 Summit Station, Greenland, a research station in Greenland
 Summit Station, Pennsylvania, an unincorporated place in Schuylkill County, Pennsylvania, United States

See also
 Summit rail station (disambiguation) for a number of rail stations called Summit